Boniodendron minus is a species of plant in the family Sapindaceae. It is native to China and Vietnam.

Conservation
Boniodendron minus was assessed as "vulnerable" in the 1998 IUCN Red List, where it is said to be native only to Vietnam. , Plants of the World Online gives it a wider distribution, including Yunnan to Hunan in China.

References

minus
Endemic flora of Vietnam
Vulnerable plants
Taxonomy articles created by Polbot